The optic vesicles project toward the sides of the head, and the peripheral part of each expands to form a hollow bulb, while the proximal part remains narrow and constitutes the optic stalk.

Closure of the choroidal fissure in the optic stalk occurs during the seventh week of development. The former optic stalk is then called the optic nerve. In short, the optic stalks are the structures that precede the optic nerves embryologically.

References

External links
 
 Overview at vision.ca

Embryology of nervous system
Human eye